Mohammad Maqbool Dar (10 November 1943 - 16 April 2008) was an Indian politician, member of parliament and the Minister of State of Home Affairs who initially served as the member of legislative assembly of Jammu and Kashmir. He was associated with Indian National Congress JK National Conference  and Janata Dal political parties.

Life and background 
Maqbool was born and raised in
Ogjibalan Nowgam village of Anantnag district from where he was elected the member of parliament in eleventh general elections. Maqbool did Master of Arts and Bachelor of Education from  University of Kashmir and then moved to Aligarh Muslim University in Uttar Pradesh where he obtained Bachelor of Laws.

Career
Maqbool was initially serving as member of Jammu and Kashmir Legislative Assembly from 1983 to 1986, and he then was elected member of parliament in India's eleventh general elections from 1996 to 1998. During his political career, he served Minister of Home Affairs from July 1996 until the term ended. He was apprehended several times over political allegations.

Personal life 
Dar was born to "Mohd Ramzan Dar" and married to "Mahtaba" and "Taja Maqbool". He was blessed with five daughters and four sons.

Death
Maqbool was suffering from head injuries when he slipped while entering the washroom on 13 April 2008. He was then taken to Sher-i-Kashmir Institute of Medical Sciences and remained under medical treatment. After an interval of some days, he died in hospital on 16 April 2008.

References 

1943 births
2008 deaths
India MPs 1996–1997
Janata Dal politicians
Indian National Congress politicians from Jammu and Kashmir
People from Anantnag
Lok Sabha members from Jammu and Kashmir
Jammu and Kashmir MLAs 1983–1986
Jammu & Kashmir National Conference politicians